Chinese coronavirus may refer to:

 Severe acute respiratory syndrome coronavirus (SARS-CoV), first reported in Foshan, Guangdong, China; in November 2002
 2002–2004 SARS outbreak
 Severe acute respiratory syndrome coronavirus 2 (SARS-CoV-2), first reported in Wuhan, Hubei, China; in December 2019
 COVID-19 pandemic in China
 COVID-19 pandemic in mainland China
 Sometimes associated with xenophobia related to the COVID-19 pandemic

See also
 Novel coronavirus (nCoV)
 Coronavirus (CoV)
 Coronaviridae
 Coronavirus diseases
 Coronavirus#Outbreaks
 Chinese virus (disambiguation)

Coronaviridae